Bertram Sharp (8 January 1876 – 2 November 1949) was an English footballer who played as a full-back with Aston Villa, Everton and Southampton around the turn of the 20th century. He was the elder brother of England international footballer and test cricketer Jack Sharp. He later became a director of Everton Football Club.

Football career
Sharp was born in Hereford and after playing his youth football with Hereford Comrades, played for Hereford Town and Hereford Thistle in the Birmingham & District League. From there, in June 1897 he joined Aston Villa who had won "the Double" in the previous season. He was joined at Villa Park by his brother, Jack.

During the opening month of the 1897–98 season, Sharp took over at full-back from Howard Spencer who had sustained a serious leg injury, causing him to miss the remainder of the season. Sharp made 19 appearances during the season, before losing his place to Tommy Bowman who had been signed from Blackpool. Villa finished the season in sixth place, a disappointment after the two previous Championship winning seasons.

For the following season, Spencer returned to the side and Sharp only made four further appearances as Villa once again took the league title.

In the summer of 1899, Sharp and his brother were both transferred to Everton. Sharp was used as cover for William Balmer and George Eccles, and made only three appearances in December 1899.

At the end of the season, Sharp moved to the south coast to join Southern League Southampton. At the "Saints", he gained a reputation as an honest, hardworking defender, who was "versatile and a good athlete". He made his debut playing at left-half in a 4–3 victory at Luton Town; after seven matches he switched to right-back, replacing Arthur Blackburn who was out with an ankle injury, with Bert Lee taking over at left-half at the start of an association with the Saints that would last until 1935. Sharp performed consistently during his one season at The Dell, at the end of which Southampton claimed the Southern League title for the fourth time in five years.

In December 1900, Southampton acquired the services of C. B. Fry, the celebrated amateur footballer – whenever Fry was available to play, Sharp was required to give way, thus missing several important games, including the FA Cup First Round defeat by Everton.

Sharp returned to Goodison Park in the summer of 1901, where he made a further six appearances towards the end of the season, before retiring from professional football.

In 1904, his amateur status was restored and he turned out for Kirkdale and then Southport Central of the Lancashire Combination.

Career outside football
Sharp was also a good cricketer and in the summer of 1900 averaged over 40 for Herefordshire.

In 1904, he became the landlord of a public house situated opposite Goodison Park. He later joined the Everton board of directors, along with his brother.

Honours
Southampton
Southern League champions: 1900–01

References

1876 births
Sportspeople from Hereford
1949 deaths
English footballers
English Football League players
Southern Football League players
Hereford Town F.C. players
Hereford Thistle F.C. players
Aston Villa F.C. players
Everton F.C. players
Southampton F.C. players
Southport F.C. players
Everton F.C. directors and chairmen
Association football fullbacks